Zeno Scudder (August 18, 1807 – June 26, 1857) was the son of Deacon Josiah and Hannah Scudder. He was a member of the United States House of Representatives from Massachusetts.  He was born in Osterville, Massachusetts on August 18, 1807. He had a paralysis in his right leg that made a naval career impossible. He studied medicine at Bowdoin College and then law at the Cambridge Law School. He was admitted to the bar in 1856 and conducted practice in Barnstable, Massachusetts. Scudder was a member of the Massachusetts Senate 1846–1848 and served as Senate President.

Scudder was elected as a Whig to the Thirty-second and Thirty-third Congresses. His special interest while in Congress was American Fisheries. He served from March 4, 1851, until his resignation on March 4, 1854.

Scudder died in Barnstable, Massachusetts on June 26, 1857 and was interred in Hillside Cemetery, Osterville.

See also
 69th Massachusetts General Court (1848)

References

External links
 

Soper Edwin L. (1959) Scudder Association, John Scudder, index 01, p. 166 Zeno Scudder

Massachusetts state senators
Presidents of the Massachusetts Senate
1807 births
1857 deaths
Whig Party members of the United States House of Representatives from Massachusetts
19th-century American politicians
People from Osterville, Massachusetts